Aranyaprathet (Thai: อรัญประเทศ) is a town (thesaban mueang) in Sa Kaeo province in eastern Thailand . It covers the entire tambon of Aranyaprathet, in Aranyaprathet district. As of 2005, the town has 16,937 inhabitants. It is located just  from the border with Cambodia; the town of Poipet is on the other side of the border. On the Thai side of the border is the huge Rongkluea market. Cambodian people cross the border daily with pushcarts and scooters with side cars loaded with their products. A significant part of the trade is in second hand clothes. Just over the border on the Cambodian side there are casinos. These are visited by many Thai people because gambling is prohibited in Thailand. Special free buses run between Bangkok and these casinos. Cambodians themselves are not allowed to gamble in these border casinos.

Climate

Aranyaprathet has a tropical savanna climate (Köppen climate classification Aw). Winters are dry and very warm. The monsoon season is from late April to October, with heavy rain and somewhat cooler temperatures during the day, although nights remain warm.

Transportation 

Aranyaprathet lies on the Route 33, part of the route connecting Bangkok and Siem Reap, the city nearest Angkor Wat, and as a result sees a large volume of tourist traffic. The road leads east to the border with Cambodia, and west to Sa Kaeo and Nakhon Nayok. Another road, Route 348, leads north to Nang Rong.

Aranyaprathet also has a railway station for the Eastern Line of the State Railway of Thailand, with a rail link to the Ban Klong Luk Border railway station to Cambodia.

References

External links

Populated places in Sa Kaeo province